The following lists events that happened during 1922 in the Belgian Congo.

Incumbent
Governor-general – Maurice Lippens

Events

General

Births
 22 February – Georges Yhambot, Congolese planter and politician

See also

 Belgian Congo
 History of the Democratic Republic of the Congo

References

Sources

 
Belgian Congo
Belgian